Thelymitra cyanapicata, commonly called the dark-tipped sun orchid, is a species of orchid that is endemic to South Australia. It has a single fleshy, linear, channelled leaf and up to three small blue or pale purplish to maroon flowers with a dark purplish blue top of the anther.

Description
The lobe on the top of the anther is dark purplish blue, gently curved and the side lobes have almost spherical tufts of white hairs. Flowering occurs in October and November but the flowers are self-pollinating and open only on hot days.

Taxonomy and naming
Thelymitra cyanapicata was first formally described in 2004 by Jeff Jeanes and the description was published in Muelleria from a specimen collected near Kuitpo. The specific epithet (cyanapicata) is said to be derived from the Latin cyan meaning "blue" and apica meaning "apex", referring to the colour of the anther lobe - a distinctive feature of this species. In classical Latin,  means "dark-blue", and is derived from Ancient Greek  (κυάνεος). The ancient Greek word  (κύανος) can also mean "dark-blue". In classical Latin, apica means "a sheep without wool on the belly", while apex is the same as the English word "apex".

Distribution and habitat
The dark-tipped sun orchid grows in Leptospermum thickets in woodland on the Fleurieu Peninsula.

Conservation
The main threats to the species are forestry practices, grazing by rabbits and hares and by weed invasion.

References

External links
 

cyanapicata
Endemic orchids of Australia
Orchids of South Australia
Plants described in 2004